Robert des Acres de L'Aigle (1843-1931) was a French politician. He served as a member of the Chamber of Deputies from 1885 to 1893.

References

1843 births
1931 deaths
People from Oise
Politicians from Hauts-de-France
French monarchists
Members of the 4th Chamber of Deputies of the French Third Republic
Members of the 5th Chamber of Deputies of the French Third Republic